Fortunatianus of Aquileia was the bishop of Aquileia in the mid-fourth century A.D.

Writings 
According to Saint Jerome, Fortunatianus was the author the oldest apparently surviving Western commentary on the Gospels known from a few excerpts (two identified by Wilmart from a Troyes manuscript and another by Bischoff from Angers) and a reference in Jerome's correspondence (thus predating Hilary on St. Matthew).

In 2012, his commentary was identified by the editor Lukas Dorfbauer in a ninth-century manuscript from the library of Cologne Cathedral.

Theology 
Fortunatianus was assumed to have favoured anti-Nicene doctrine, though a text from 984 to 986 clearly states that Trinity was one substance he inclined. He also admitted a large figurative element in the Gospel narratives. An interesting detail is his identification of two of the four Evangelists based on Ezekiel and the Apocalypse at the opening of his text: Mark is the eagle and John the lion.

Fortunatianus was a signatory at the western Council of Serdica which condemned Arius' teaching. He subsequently entertained Athanasius on his return journey from Treves to Alexandria, and was chosen by Pope Liberius to defend Athanasius at the Council of Milan. However he yielded to pressure from Emperor Constantius II. In the aftermath of the council, he urged Pope Liberius to conform.

References

Fortunatianus Aquileiensis: Commentaria in Evangelia, ed. Lukas J. Dorfbauer, (Corpus Scriptorum Ecclesiasticorum Latinorum, Band 103), De Gruyter  2017
H. Houghton, English translation, CSEL (extra seriem), 2017

External links
Houghton, H. "Lost Latin commentary on the Gospels rediscovered after 1,500 years thanks to digital technology". Article about the discovery of the manuscript.

Bishops of Aquileia
4th-century Italian bishops
4th-century Latin writers